Dorlan Mauricio Pabón Ríos (born 24 January 1988) is a Colombian professional footballer who plays as a forward for Atlético Nacional. He is nicknamed Memín, after an old Mexican comic character named Memín Pinguín.

Club career

Envigado
Pabón started his career with Envigado, where he became the top goalscorer of the 2008 Copa Colombia alongside Wilson Mena.

Nacional
In 2010, Pabón moved to Colombian team Atlético Nacional. He is remembered for scoring a free-kick from 40 yards against Peñarol during a 2012 Copa Libertadores group stage game which Nacional won 4–0 away from home, with two of the goals coming from Pabón. Nacional went on to lose in the Round of 16 against Velez Sarsfield. Pabón ended the Copa Libertadores tournament with 7 goals, and being named player of the week for the tournament once, in 21–23 February.

With Nacional, Pabón also won the 2011 Liga Postobón Apertura, in which Nacional faced La Equidad, after losing the first leg 2–1, Nacional needed to win by a goal in the second leg to go into penalties. Pabón scored two goals in the away leg which ended 2–1, and scored his penalty in the shootout, which helped Nacional win its 11th National title. He has also scored a total of 50 goals in 71 games for Nacional since his arrival.

Parma
Pabón attracted interest from many European clubs, eventually joining Serie A club Parma F.C. on 27 June 2012, signing a five-year contract. His spell in Italy was not a great success, producing 1 goal in 11 games. During the January 2013 transfer window, C.F. Monterrey announced that Pabón would be transferred the following summer to play for them.

Betis (loan)
Shortly after being transferred to Monterrey, it was announced that Pabón would be loaned to Real Betis in Spain for the next six months. However, he was registered as a loan by Parma because FIFA does not allow a player to be registered to three teams in one season. Therefore, having been registered by Monterrey he would not have been able to play for Betis. Pabón scored a higher goal per game ratio in Spain than he did in Italy. He notably scored a goal against FC Barcelona in just the first minute of the game.

Valencia
On 16 August 2013, it was announced that Pabón would be returning to La Liga with Valencia CF, after spending just a summer at C.F. Monterrey. Having been impressed with his short spell at Betis for the latter half of the 2012–13 season, Valencia agreed to pay €7.5 million for his services. On 1 September 2013, he made his debut in his new team, against FC Barcelona in an eventual 2–3 home loss. Pabón scored his first goal for the Che on 19 October 2013, in a 1–2 loss to Real Sociedad.

São Paulo (loan)
On 27 January 2014, Pabón signed for one year on loan with Brazilian side São Paulo FC. Even after being Valencia's most expensive signing in the 2013–14 transfer window, Pabón did not adapt in Valencia and, with Eduardo Vargas' arrival, he faced more competition for a place in the first team, resulting in his decision to join another club.

Pabón scored his first goal for his new club on 26 February: in a penalty kick, the Colombian scored the last goal of a 3–1 victory against XV de Piracicaba, in a 2014 São Paulo State League game. Pabón asked for Rogério Ceni, long-time idol in the club and official penalty kicker, to take it. According to Ceni: "He had already asked me to take it against Santos (who São Paulo faced before XV de Piracicaba). But this is not a problem here."

On 3 June 2014, Pabón left Tricolor, with the club, in its site, thanking the forward by his presentations for the city of the same name's side. In his last game for club, on 31 May, in the 2–1 win against Atlético Mineiro, Pabón scored the winning goal in the last minutes of the game. He said: "I remain very happy for the opportunity to have played for a giant club as São Paulo FC who gave me my first passage into Brazilian football."

Monterrey
In June 2014, the Monterrey confirmed it had signed the Colombian from Valencia for $7 million. On 1 July, 2021, Pabón and C.F. Monterrey parted ways by mutual consent.

Club statistics

Honours

Atlético Nacional
Categoría Primera A (2): 2011-1, 2022-1.

Monterrey
Liga MX (1): Apertura 2019
Copa MX (2): Apertura 2017, 2019–20
CONCACAF Champions League (2): 2019, 2021

Individual
Liga MX Golden Boot: Clausura 2015

International career
Pabón made his debut for the senior side for a 2010 FIFA World Cup qualification match against Chile. His first goal for the senior side came against Bolivia in La Paz for a 2014 FIFA World Cup qualification match, Colombia went on to win the match 2–1 thanks to a late goal from Falcao. His second goal for Colombia came against Argentina in Barranquilla. Colombia went on to lose the game 2–1.

References

External links

1988 births
Living people
Association football forwards
Colombian footballers
Footballers from Medellín
Envigado F.C. players
Atlético Nacional footballers
Parma Calcio 1913 players
Real Betis players
C.F. Monterrey players
Valencia CF players
São Paulo FC players
Categoría Primera A players
Categoría Primera B players
Serie A players
La Liga players
Liga MX players
Campeonato Brasileiro Série A players
Colombia international footballers
Colombian expatriate footballers
Expatriate footballers in Italy
Colombian expatriate sportspeople in Italy
Expatriate footballers in Spain
Colombian expatriate sportspeople in Spain
Expatriate footballers in Mexico
Expatriate footballers in Brazil
Colombian expatriate sportspeople in Brazil
Footballers at the 2016 Summer Olympics
Olympic footballers of Colombia